Better Call Saul is an American television crime drama series created by Vince Gilligan and Peter Gould that premiered on AMC on February 8, 2015. It is a spin-off, prequel, and sequel of Gilligan's previous series, Breaking Bad. It stars Bob Odenkirk, Jonathan Banks, Rhea Seehorn, Patrick Fabian, Michael Mando, Michael McKean, Giancarlo Esposito, and Tony Dalton. Set in the early-to-mid-2000s in Albuquerque, New Mexico, the series develops Jimmy McGill (Odenkirk), an earnest lawyer and former con-man, into an egocentric criminal defense attorney known as Saul Goodman. A sixth and final season began airing in 2022.

Since its release, Better Call Saul has received critical acclaim, with particular praise for its acting, characters, writing, direction, and cinematography. The series has been nominated for numerous accolades, winning five awards for Television Program of the Year from the American Film Institute. For his performance as Jimmy McGill, Bob Odenkirk was nominated for five Golden Globes for Best Actor in a Television Series Drama. Rhea Seehorn's portrayal of Kim Wexler won her two Satellite Awards for Best Supporting Actress in a Series, Miniseries or Television Film, and one Saturn Award for Best Supporting Actress on Television.

For his work on the show, screenwriter Gordon Smith has been nominated for three Primetime Emmy Awards for Outstanding Writing for a Drama Series and two Writers Guild of America Awards for Best Episodic Drama. Additionally, Phillip W. Palmer, Larry Benjamin, and Kevin Valentine have all been nominated for three consecutive Creative Arts Emmy Awards for Outstanding Sound Mixing for a Comedy or Drama Series. Series creator Vince Gilligan has also received multiple nominations, including four for Producers Guild of America Awards for Best Episodic Drama, which he shared with various crew members of the show. Many critics have called Better Call Saul a worthy successor to Breaking Bad and one of the best prequels ever made. The series has garnered 48 nominations for Primetime and Creative Arts Emmy Awards, 16 for Writers Guild of America Awards, 15 for Critics' Choice Television Awards, 12 for Satellite Awards, 6 for Screen Actors Guild Awards, and 6 for Golden Globes.

Awards and nominations

See also
 List of awards and nominations received by Breaking Bad
 List of accolades received by El Camino: A Breaking Bad Movie

Notes

References

External links
 

Awards
Better Call Saul